Nabovvat Metro Station is a station of Mashhad Metro Line 2. The station opened on 15 February 2017. It is located on Tabarsi Boulevard at the intersection with Nobovvat and Gaz Streets.

References

Mashhad Metro stations
Railway stations opened in 2017
2017 establishments in Iran